The Donkey Sanctuary of Canada is a Canadian registered charity and sanctuary devoted to the welfare and rescue of donkeys, mules and hinnies.

It was founded by Sandra Pady with her husband David in Guelph, Ontario.  It is similar to The Donkey Sanctuary founded by Elizabeth Svendsen in England and Svendsen provided advice to Sandra Pady when she started.

References

External links 
The Donkey Sanctuary of Canada official website

Animal charities based in Canada
Organizations established in 1992
1992 establishments in Ontario